Vicente Martínez-Pujalte López (Murcia, Spain, 11 January 1956) is a Spanish politician who was a Popular's Party (Spain)(PP) deputy for Murcia region. A former University Professor of economic sciences at the University of Valencia he is also a technical officer in the Official Chamber of Commerce for the Valencia region. He has also been vice-chairman of Levante Football Club.

Political career
Martínez-Pujalte joined the Spanish Congress of Deputies on 28 June 1996 in substitution for José Manuel García-Margallo y Marfil. He represented Valencia region until 2008 when he moved to Murcia region. He is the brother of Jesús Roque Martínez-Pujalte who represented the Union of the Democratic Centre (UCD) in the 1977-1979 congress.

Published works
 Analisis Del Sistema De Financiacion Autonomica: Bases Para Un Nuevo Modelo by Vicente Martinez-Pujalte Lopez and Pablo Oliete Vivas 
Hardcover, Bancaja,  (84-89413-72-X)

External links
 Biography at Spanish Congress site
 Interview at ElPais 18-02-2008
 http://www.eldiario.es/politica/Vicente-Martinez-Pujalte-millones-cuentas_0_584092296.html

1956 births
Living people
People from Murcia
Members of the 6th Congress of Deputies (Spain)
Members of the 7th Congress of Deputies (Spain)
Members of the 8th Congress of Deputies (Spain)
Members of the 9th Congress of Deputies (Spain)
Politicians from the Valencian Community
People's Party (Spain) politicians